Vahid Mustafayev (born 4 September 1968) is a well-known Azerbaijani journalist and filmmaker. He is a president of ANS Group of Companies and was a co-founder and President of ANS Independent Broadcast Company in Azerbaijan before it was closed in 2016. Starting his career in the early 1990s, Mustafayev quickly made his way up due to his business skills. He created several films about the Nagorno-Karabakh conflict events.

He was awarded with “Progress” medal for his role in the development of television in Azerbaijan.

Filmography 
 Bloody January (writer)-2015
 Aghabayovlar (TV series)-2012
 Xoca (written by)-2012
 Yaddash (as Vahid Nakhish)-2010
 Bulaqistan (TV movie)-2009
 Sechilan 2008

References

Azerbaijani businesspeople
Living people
Company founders
Place of birth missing (living people)
1968 births